The Silver Horde may refer to:

The Silver Horde, 1909 American novel by Rex Beach#Biography set in Alaska
The Silver Horde (1920 film), American adaptation, directed by Frank Lloyd
The Silver Horde (1930 film), American adaptation, directed by George Archainbaud
The Silver Horde (Discworld characters), group of old barbarians in Terry Pratchett's Discworld fantasy series